The Volkswagen Up (stylized as Volkswagen up!) is a city car, part of the Volkswagen Group New Small Family (NSF) series of models, unveiled at the 2011 International Motor Show Germany (IAA). Production of the Up started in December 2011 at the Volkswagen Plant in Bratislava, Slovakia. A battery electric version, called E-up, was launched in autumn 2013. The SEAT Mii and Škoda Citigo are rebadged versions of the Up, with slightly different front and rear fascias, and were manufactured in the same factory before being withdrawn from sale in 2021 and 2020 respectively.

Overview

Pre-production 
The production Up follows a series of concept cars, starting in 2007 at the Frankfurt Motor Show. The exterior was originally designed by the Brazilian designer Marco Pavone. This design was chosen and enhanced by Volkswagen Group Chief Designer Walter de'Silva, and Head Designer of the Volkswagen Passenger Cars marque, Klaus Zyciora. Shown at the Frankfurt launch were several further Up concepts, including a  GT version, a natural gas-powered Eco-up! (with  emissions of 79 g/km) and a four-door Cross model.

Where the Up concept used a rear-engine, rear-wheel drive layout, the 2011 production model has a front-engine, front-wheel drive layout, using the NSF platform, with a 3-cylinder 1.0-litre petrol engine.

It was originally reported that the Up concept would be produced under the name Lupo, like the Volkswagen Lupo that was discontinued in 2005. Eventually this plan changed and the 2011 production model was named the Up.

Production version 
At the International Motor Show Germany in 2011, Volkswagen unveiled the final version of the Up based on the Volkswagen New Small Family (NSF) modular architecture. Both the three and five doors are available with engines running on CNG and called eco-Up. The cabin is configured to four or five seats.

Volkswagen announced the Up range will be extended to include a production version of the GT Up concept, for launch in 2013. This will feature a turbocharged version of the 1.0-litre three-cylinder engine producing  and will look similar to the concept version. An electric hybrid Up — which will be badged Blue-e-motion — will follow.

Along with the other two rebadged models, Up is the first car in its class to offer an automated braking system, called City Emergency Braking. The system is automatically activated at speeds below , when a laser sensor identifies a danger of collision and activates the brakes. In the SEAT model, the system is called City Safety Assist and in the Škoda model it is called City Safe Drive.

The Up won the 2012 World Car of the Year.

Marketing 

The Up! is available to order in the United Kingdom since October 2011 for five models – marketed as Take Up, Move Up, High Up, Up Black and Up White. British television show Top Gear presenters mocked the unusual name by calling the model "Up-exclamation-mark".

The Up was introduced on the German market on 3 December 2011. Deliveries to other European markets began in April 2012.

In 2013, Volkswagen introduced the cross up! model, which has 15 mm more ground clearance than the standard model, and comes with plastic side skirts and wheel-arch flares as standard.

In 2014, at the Geneva Motor Show, Seat presented the 2014 Seat Mii by Mango model aimed towards women, made in collaboration with the Spanish fashion company Mango.

The SEAT Mii limited production started in October 2011 for the European market, with sales having started at the end of 2011. The final version was launched in May 2012.

The Up was sold in Australia until 2015, when it was withdrawn due to slow sales. Plans for the Škoda Citigo to be sold in Australia were also shelved.

At the Geneva Motor Show in 2016, the model sold in Europe received a facelift and the new TSI engine, that went on sale in the summer the same year.

There are no plans to sell the Up in North America, or in the CIS countries, Middle East, India, China, South Korea, and Southeast Asia. Japanese sales began 1 October 2012; it and the Polo are the only two VW products that comply with Japanese government dimension regulations. The Up launched in South Africa on 1 March 2015. Two models were offered at launch, both are the 1-litre 55 kW three-door variant. The two local options were marketed as Take Up, and the Move Up.

Latin America 

In February 2014, Volkswagen introduced a modified version of the Up for Latin America. Built in Brazil, the Latin American Up differs from its European counterpart in length (it is  longer), thanks to revisions to the floorpan's rear section to accommodate a larger fuel tank (50 L instead of Europe's 35 L), a full-sized spare wheel and increased cargo space. All versions have revised tailgates with a painted metal section (like the Seat Mii's and Škoda Citigo's) instead of the dark glass trim used in Europe. The five-door Brazilian Up also uses a different rear door design with sectioned glass and wind-down windows. The South American model retains the European version's safety levels with a five-star crash rating and ample use of high-strength steel elements.

In July 2015, Volkswagen introduced a new powertrain for the Up sold in Brazil, using a 1.0-litre, direct fuel injection three-cylinder turbocharged engine.

Up GTI

In mid-December 2016, Volkswagen presented the Up GTI. The car has an 85 kW 1-litre three-cylinder engine. It is the only Up to be available with a six-speed manual gearbox. The Up GTI went on sale in 2018. In April 2019 ordering for the Up GTI was discontinued in the United Kingdom, but in January 2020 VW UK started taking orders again for a lightly refreshed version. The refresh included small optional equipment changes, but no alterations to the powertrain, chassis or brakes. As of January 2023, new orders for the Up GTI were closed to allow time to complete orders before the GTI model ceased production.

E-up

First iteration
In July 2010 VW announced the production version of the E-up electric car, with sales scheduled to begin in 2013, and was subsequently unveiled at the September 2013 International Motor Show Germany.

The E-up can be charged with 2.3 kW plugged into any standard 230 V socket, with 3.6 kW via a home-installed wall box or with up to 40 kW plugged into a DC fast-charging station via the optional Combined Charging System (CCS), which allows the battery to charge up to 80% in under 30 minutes. The production version has the same dimensions as the five-door petrol model with seating for four.

Second iteration 
A second iteration of the e-up was announced on 5 September 2019.

The Škoda version was released as the Škoda Citigo-e iV, with a 36.8kWh battery capacity and a range of 270 km (165 miles) under WLTP standard, and was mass-produced from autumn 2019. It is the first all-electric car of Škoda Auto and replaced the combustion engine version.

Similarly, the petrol-powered Seat Mii was replaced with an electric version, the Mii Electric.

Sales and market

Retail deliveries began in Germany in October 2013, followed shortly after by Denmark, Sweden, France, Norway, and the Netherlands, and the UK at the end of January 2014. The E-up! is not sold in the U.S. or Canada.

As of October 2019, the cumulative number of E-ups registered in Norway was 9,993.

As of January 2020, Volkswagen have sold 21,000 E-up! Worldwide.

Technical data

Powertrain

Both engines are also available with BlueMotion technologies (SEAT: Ecomotive, Škoda: Green Tech), which incorporates a start-stop system and regenerative brakes to reduce carbon emissions. Depending on markets, some 60PS and 75PS models are available with optional five-speed automatic transmission.

Safety

Latin NCAP

In 2014, the Latin-American Volkswagen Up was evaluated under the Latin NCAP assessment and achieved a 5-star security rating for adults and 4-star security rating for children:

Euro NCAP

2011
In 2011, the SEAT Mii was evaluated for its safety performance under the Euro NCAP assessment scheme and it achieved a 5-star overall rating:

2019
The CITIGO in its standard European configuration received 3 stars from Euro NCAP in 2019.

The up! in its standard European configuration received 3 stars from Euro NCAP in 2019.

The Mii in its standard European configuration received 3 stars from Euro NCAP in 2019.

Environmental performance
In February 2019 Green NCAP assessed Volkswagen Up GTI with 1.0 L TSI engine and 6-speed manual gearbox:

Škoda Citigo 
The Škoda Citigo is rebadged versions of the Up, with slightly different front and rear fascias. Citigo was launched in the Czech Republic in October 2011. It began sales in other European countries from summer 2012. It was manufactured at the Volkswagen Plant in Bratislava, Slovakia. Plans for sales in Russia and most other CIS countries were cancelled due to its dimensions being deemed too small for the market. The Škoda Citigo was also sold in Israel and New Zealand for a short time. The Citigo was slightly updated with a facelift model in 2017. A fully electric version, the Škoda Citigo-e iV, with a 36.8kWh battery capacity and a range of 270 km (165 miles) under WLTP standard, was mass-produced from autumn 2019 and replaced the combustion engine version. It was the first all-electric car of Škoda Auto. In autumn 2020, Škoda terminated the sale of Citigo electric cars.

Concept models
From 2007 through to 2010 Volkswagen showed a number of concept versions of the Up prior to the launch of the production-ready version in 2011.

2007 Up concept
The two-door Up concept debuted at the 2007 IAA International Motor Show Germany in Germany, with a rear-wheel drive, rear-mounted, boxer engine and 18 inch wheels.

The interior is designed to accommodate four adults, and features flat-folding, air inflatable seats. It also has two monitors on the dashboard, one showing vehicle statistics and the other controlling the in-car multimedia system.

2007 Space Up concept

The four-door four-seater mini MPV styled space up! concept car debuted at the 2007 Tokyo Auto Show in Japan.

The 'butterfly' doors open in a similar manner to those on the Mazda RX-8; the front doors conventionally hinged at the front, whilst the rears are hinged at the rear from the C-pillar, eliminating the B-pillar.

Also for the first time Volkswagen showed images of its internal combustion engine, a Fuel Stratified Injection (FSI) petrol engine.

2007 Space Up Blue Concept
The four-seater space up! blue concept, the third variant of the Volkswagen Up concept series, debuted at the 2007 Los Angeles Auto Show.

The Space Up Blue was visually the same as the Space Up and shared its length and width, but it included a different roof with a 150 watt solar cell which recharges the batteries.

Twelve lithium-ion batteries give the Space Up Blue  of power and a  range.

2009 E-up concept car

The two-door Volkswagen e-up! zero-emissions concept debuted at the 63rd International Motor Show Germany in 2009.

Quick charging will charge the battery up to 80% in an hour, while a regular 230 volt plug will take five hours. The roof of the E-up has a 1.4 square metre solar cell which supplies power to the vehicle's electrics, and when parked can power ventilation fans to help cool the interior when parked in bright sunlight on a hot day. The solar cells can be increased in size to a total area of 1.7 square metre by folding down the sun visors.

Interior equipment includes a touch-screen human machine interface (HMI), one notable feature allows the charge to be delayed within the HMI programming, utilising cheap-rate night-time electricity—and this can also be remotely programmed via an iPhone or similar device.

2009 Up Lite concept

The Volkswagen up! Lite was revealed at the 2009 Los Angeles Auto Show. It is a four-seater hybrid concept car based on Volkswagen L1 technologies. The Volkswagen Up Lite concept car has a hybrid powertrain with one  two-cylinder Turbocharged Direct Injection (TDI) diesel engine and one  electric motor, using a seven-speed dual-clutch transmission.

2010 Volkswagen IN
The Volkswagen IN is a design study created by Brazilian interns of Volkswagen do Brasil which carries a significant resemblance to the Up concept cars. It is a two-seater-plus-luggage sub-compact, capable of adopting a variety of powertrains, including a fully electric one using in-wheels electric engines. The mock-up in 1:1 scale was presented to the press on 29 January 2010.

2011 Buggy Up

The Volkswagen Buggy Up! concept debuted at the 2011 Frankfurt Auto Show in Germany.

The Buggy Up is a dune buggy based on the Up platform.

2011 Up Azzurra Sailing Team

The Up! Azzurra Sailing Team concept debuted at the 2011 Frankfurt Auto Show in Germany.

The Azzurra was designed to look and feel like a luxury yacht, with a fully waterproof interior, blue and white leather seats, and chrome and wood trim. The rear seats have wooden backs, so when they are folded down the trunk looks like the deck of a yacht. It has no roof, and wooden railings in place of the doors and rear hatch.

Awards
 Scottish Car of the Year 'Compact Car of the Year' 2012
 Top Gear Magazine 'Small Car of the Year' 2011
 What Car? 'Car of the Year' 2012
 What Car? 'City Car of the Year' 2013
 World Car of the Year 2012

Sales

References

External links

 

Up!
Up!
City cars
Electric city cars
Hybrid electric cars
Fuel cell vehicles
Cars introduced in 2011
Hatchbacks
Front-wheel-drive vehicles
Euro NCAP superminis
Latin NCAP superminis